Edward Andrei (born 19 January 1975) is a Romanian former water polo player who competed in the 1996 Summer Olympics.

References

1975 births
Living people
Romanian male water polo players
Olympic water polo players of Romania
Water polo players at the 1996 Summer Olympics
Romanian water polo coaches